Reisenbach Telecommunication Tower ( German designation: Fernmeldeturm Reisenbach) is among the tallest structures in the Northern parts of Baden-Württemberg.  Only the two masts of Donebach longwave transmitter are taller in the Mudau community. As the masts of Donebach transmitter, Reisenbach Telecommunication Tower is property of Deutsche Telekom AG. 

It is a concrete telecommunication tower from the FMT3 type. It is among the tallest standardised telecommunication towers (Typenturm) of the Deutsche Telekom AG.

Reisenbach Telecommunication Tower was built in 1972.  It is situated in the part Reisenbach of Mudau at Kirchstraase. It is used as directional radio tower and for transmitting the program of "sunshine live" on 100 kW with an ERP of 25 kW.

See also
 List of towers

External links
 http://skyscraperpage.com/diagrams/?b60558
 

Communication towers in Germany
Towers completed in 1972
1972 establishments in West Germany
Buildings and structures in Baden-Württemberg